Rhombophryne minuta is a species of frog in the family Microhylidae. It is endemic to northern Madagascar. It has been mixed with other species such as Rhombophryne mangabensis; it is known with certainty only from the Marojejy National Park.

Description
The tympanum is indistinct. The dorsal skin is smooth to slightly granular. Colouration is quite variable; the dorsum is uniformly brown or with dark reticulations and yellowish spots. Flanks often bear small white dots. A largely yellowish specimen with a broad yellowish median stripe bordered by a dark line is also known. The venter has distinct or indistinct dark reticulations.

Habitat and conservation
It is a fossorial and terrestrial species. Its forest habitat is threatened by subsistence agriculture, timber extraction, charcoal manufacture, spread of invasive species (eucalyptus), livestock grazing, and expanding human settlements. Illegal timber extraction has also occurred in the Marojejy National Park.

References 

minuta
Amphibians described in 1975
Taxa named by Jean Marius René Guibé
Endemic frogs of Madagascar
Taxonomy articles created by Polbot